The Tyne and Wear Development Corporation (TWDC) was established in 1987 to develop land on the banks of the River Tyne and the River Wear in England. Its flagship developments included the regeneration of the East Quayside in Newcastle, Royal Quays in North Tyneside and St Peter's in Sunderland. During its lifetime  of non-housing development and 4,550 housing units were built. Around 33,707 new jobs were created and some £1,115m of private finance was leveraged in.
The Chairman was Sir Paul Nicholson and the Chief Executive was Alastair Balls. It was dissolved in 1998.

The legacy of TWDC remains controversial within the region in particular in Sunderland where it is believed the investment in services and leisure opportunities in Newcastle where the corporation was based was not matched in the rest of the region. The Corporation also invested heavily in developing the Tyne and Wear Metro system although this did not get extended to Sunderland until after the Corporation was shut down.

References

External links
Tyne and Wear Development Corporation Archives (NERA)

Newcastle upon Tyne
Organisations based in Tyne and Wear
Development Corporations of the United Kingdom
Defunct public bodies of the United Kingdom
Defunct companies based in Tyne and Wear
Organizations established in 1987
Organizations disestablished in 1998
1987 establishments in England
1998 disestablishments in England